Albiorix may refer to:
 A Celtic theonym that appears as an epithet of the Roman Mars
 Albiorix (arachnid), a genus of arachnids in the family Ideoroncidae
 Albiorix (Gaulish deity)
 Albiorix (moon), a satellite of Saturn